The Cadillac Fleetwood is a model of luxury car that was manufactured by the Cadillac division of General Motors between 1976 and 1996. The "Fleetwood" name was previously used as a prefix on several of Cadillac's models dating back to 1935. Four-door Fleetwoods generally had longer wheelbases than Cadillac's more common Series 62 and DeVille models.

Through 1984, all Fleetwood series cars were rear-wheel drive. Between 1985 and 1992, the Fleetwood name was used on new front-wheel drive models that were closely related to the concurrent DeVille. The older RWD Fleetwood was also kept in production through 1992; it was first known as the Fleetwood Brougham through 1987 and from then on as simply Brougham. In 1987, a stretched-wheelbase version of the front-wheel drive model joined the lineup as the Fleetwood 60 Special, a name which was last used as a trim level on the 1970 Fleetwood. In 1993, a new rear-wheel drive Fleetwood was introduced and was built through 1996.

Before 1934, all Cadillac models could be ordered with bodies built by the General Motors Fleetwood coachbuilding operation in Fleetwood, Pennsylvania. Between 1935 and 1941, cars bearing the Fleetwood name were assembled there.

Pre-history 1916–1924

Lawrence P. Fisher was the Fisher brother most closely involved with Cadillac in its early years. In 1916 he joined the Fisher Body Company that had been formed by two of his brothers in 1908. Larry (as people knew him) was one of four of the seven Fisher brothers who brought Fisher Body Corporation under the General Motors umbrella in 1919. In May 1925 Alfred P. Sloan, then the head of General Motors, appointed Fisher as Cadillac General Manager, an office he retained through 1934. Fisher immediately went to work adding exclusive, custom bodies to the Cadillac range. Thus, he oversaw the purchase of the Fleetwood Metal Body Company by the Fisher Body Corporation in September 1925.

The Fleetwood Body Company of Fleetwood, Pennsylvania, was founded by Harry Urich in the nineteenth century. It began as a small community of craftsmen founded by Henry Fleetwood, Esq. of Penwortham, near Lancaster, England (the Fleetwood family flourished in England in the 17th and 18th centuries). The traditions of 300 years of coach-building that the Fleetwood Body Company applied to its work on cars secured it a high reputation in automobile circles worldwide by the 1920s. Coachwork was built by Fleetwood for a variety of luxury makes through 1924.

After the Fisher Body Corporation purchased the Fleetwood Body Company in 1925, Fleetwood bodies were reserved exclusively for Cadillac. By 1929 GM had purchased the remaining stock holdings of the Fisher Body Corporation and thus became the sole owner of both the Fisher and Fleetwood companies. From 1927 through 1934 all Cadillac series offered Fleetwood bodies as an option.

"Fleetwood" title used as prefix 1935–1986 

After 1934, Cadillac became more selective in offering Fleetwood bodies on its series and by 1938 the only way to obtain a Fleetwood-bodied car was by buying a Cadillac Series 75 or 90, as even the Cadillac Sixty Special had a Fisher body in its inaugural year. The Fleetwood script and crest would not appear on the exterior of any Cadillac until the 1947 model year when it appeared on the rear deck lid of the Sixty Special. By 1952 it also appeared on the rear deck lid of the Series 75. In 1957 the Cadillac Series 70 Eldorado Brougham joined the Sixty Special and the Series 75 as the only Cadillac models with Fleetwood bodies although Fleetwood script or crests did not appear anywhere on the exterior of the car. This marked the first time in 20 years that a Fleetwood bodied car was paired with the Brougham name. When production of the Eldorado Brougham was shifted in 1959 from the Cadillac Fleetwood plant in Detroit to Pininfarina in Turin, Italy, only then did it acquire Fleetwood wheel discs and doorsill moldings, presumably because the design work and final touches were still being done by Fleetwood. 

Production of the Eldorado Brougham ceased in 1961 but in 1963 the Eldorado Biarritz also became Fleetwood bodied and immediately acquired Fleetwood crests on its rear quarters and Fleetwood rocker panel moldings. The 1963 Eldorado Biarritz was also the first Fleetwood bodied convertible since the Cadillac Series 75 stopped offering 4-door and 2-door convertible body styles and production of the Cadillac Series 90 ceased in 1941.

In 1965, the Eldorado, Sixty Special, and Series 75 models were designated as Fleetwood “subseries” but this would only last through the 1972 model year, and during this period there never was a separate Fleetwood series per se. Fleetwood became a much more integral part of a Cadillac series name in 1977 with the introduction of the Cadillac Fleetwood Brougham and the Cadillac Fleetwood Limousine, which replaced the Fleetwood Sixty Special Brougham and the Fleetwood 75 respectively. In 1985, Fleetwood became a separate series in its own right.

Fleetwood as sole designation 1985–1996

Front-wheel drive: 1985–1993

In 1985, Fleetwood models used a new front wheel drive C-body platform, sharing the  wheelbase with GM's other C-body cars, the DeVille, Buick Electra, and Oldsmobile Ninety-Eight. The Fleetwood Brougham continued to use the RWD platform, (which was redesignated as "D-body" for 1985) through 1986.

As had been the case since the 1977 model year, there were little more than trim differences between the Fleetwood and the DeVille. For 1985, the Fleetwood was actually a de Ville trim option, rather than a separate model. The optional d'Elegance package, added tufted-button seating among other niceties for the FWD Fleetwood sedan. The Fleetwood coupe had been dropped after the 1986 model year, but returned in 1989. The Fleetwood coupe for 1989 - 1992 was not popular with model year production in 1989: 4,108, 1990: 2,438, 1991: 894, and for 1992: a mere 443.

Cadillac offered the Fleetwood Sixty Special for model years 1987-1988, using a stretched  version of the new C-body platform — as well as the Fleetwood Series 75 for model years 1985-1987, using a  stretched version of the same platform. The aluminum 4.1 L HT-4100 V8 was replaced by the 4.5 L HT-4500 for 1988. The engine displacement was increased for 1991 to the 4.9 L HT-4900.

The Fleetwood line was redesigned for the 1989 model year to include skirted rear wheels. The slightly revised Fleetwood coupe, with extended front and rear styling, was sold from 1989 and ended in 1992.

It was replaced by the  4.9 L HT-4900 for 1991.

The Fleetwood nameplate departed the front-drive lineup for 1993 (as Fleetwood was transferred to the new rear-drive replacement for the 1992 Brougham). Instead, the Sixty Special nameplate was used on the front-wheel drive model for 1993. A total of 5,292 Sixty Specials were built during 1993, including 688 with the optional "Ultra" Package that featured 22-way adjustable front seats, designed in Italy by Giorgetto Giugiaro. This seating package had been standard on the Sixty Special since 1989, but in 1993, it became a $3,550 option. While it was based upon the DeVille, the Sixty Special included eleven items as standard equipment, while those eleven items were optional at extra cost on DeVilles. There were options for the Sixty Special, that were unavailable on the DeVille, such as "Memory Seat" for the driver with two recall settings, an "Exit" button" when pushed automatically powered the driver seat all the way rearward, and dual front seat power recliners.

Both the Fleetwood and DeVille were coded as C-bodies in the fourth digit of the VIN. The fifth digit coded the DeVille as "D" (with the later Touring Sedan becoming "T"), the Fleetwood as "B", and the Fleetwood Sixty Special as "S". The Sixty Special became the "G" code for 1991, and switched back to "B" for its 1993 run.

Transmissions included the THM440 T4 (1985–1986), the 4T60 (1987–1989), and the 4T60E (1990–1993).

Rear-wheel drive 1993–1996

For 1993, the Fleetwood model moved from the de Ville's front wheel drive C-body to the newly revised rear wheel drive D-body, used previously by the Cadillac Brougham. It was one of the first American front-wheel drive vehicles to be returned to rear-wheel drive.{cn} At  overall, the Fleetwood was, at the time, the longest production car made in the United States. All Fleetwoods except for the commercial chassis had standard antilock brakes, traction control, and dual front airbags. In 1994, Cadillac used the Corvette-derived LT1  engine rated at  along with the new 4L60E automatic transmission. Between 1993 and 1996, the Fleetwood commercial chassis was used instead of the de Ville for most funeral coaches and limousines produced during these years. The DeVille was used again in 1997, after production of the Fleetwood ceased. After 1996, the Cadillac Fleetwood was retired by General Motors along with all other rear-wheel drive sedans, and the assembly plant was converted to truck production for the Chevrolet Suburban and Tahoe because of the increasing demand for SUVs.

The Brougham option package included a full vinyl top, C-pillar badging, specific seat design with six-way driver's seat memory, and heated three-position lumbar front seats, instrument panel badging, rear-seat vanity mirrors, and rear-seat storage armrest. The full vinyl top could be deleted from the package, and the seats could be upholstered in either Prestwick Cloth or leather.

Other options included a CD player, a full-size spare tire, a sliding glass moonroof (dubbed "Astro roof"), chrome wheels, a security package, and an automatically dimming rear-view mirror.

The  trailer towing package was made available 1993, a return to production sedan since the 1971–1976 Cadillac Sixty Special. The RPO V4P package included heavy-duty cooling (RPO V08, which consisted of a seven-blade mechanical primary fan, a heavy-duty electrical secondary fan, and an extra capacity radiator), RPO FE2 Suspension System Ride Handling, HD 4L60 transmission, RPO KC4 Cooling System Engine Oil, RPO KD1 Cooling System Transmission Oil, RPO KG9 140 amp alternator, and RPO GT4 3.73 gears with an 8.5-inch ring gear. In 1994–1996, the V4P package was revised with RPO GU6 3.42 gears with the new more powerful RPO LT1  V8, and HD 4L60E transmission with revised accumulators to shift smoother with the shorter rear axle gearing.  Transmissions included the 4L60 (1993) and 4L60E (1994-1996).

A modified, extended wheelbase seventh generation Deville, was marketed as the  Fleetwood Limited for 1998-1999 by the independent customizer,  Superior Coach Company.

References 

Fleetwood
1940s cars
1950s cars
1960s cars
1970s cars
1980s cars
Flagship vehicles
Front-wheel-drive vehicles
Full-size vehicles
Motor vehicles manufactured in the United States
Rear-wheel-drive vehicles
Sedans
Limousines
Cars introduced in 1993